The Hirao coupling (also called the Hirao reaction or the Hirao cross-coupling) is the chemical reaction involving the palladium-catalyzed cross-coupling of a dialkyl phosphite and an aryl halide to form a phosphonate.
This reaction is named after Toshikazu Hirao and is related to the Michaelis-Arbuzov reaction. In contrast to the classic Michaelis-Arbuzov reaction, which is limited to alkyl phosphonates, the Hirao coupling can also deliver aryl phosphonates.

References

Organic reactions
Name reactions